NKOTBSB is a supergroup consisting of two American boy bands, New Kids on the Block and Backstreet Boys.

NKOTBSB may also refer to:
NKOTBSB (album)
NKOTBSB Tour